is a 1969 Japanese film directed by Kazuo Ikehiro. It is based on Kosuke Gomi's novel . The film depicts the early years of Horibe Yasubei and Tange Tenzen's relationship.

Cast
Hiroki Matsukata as Tange Tenzen
Kojiro Hongo as Nakayama Yasubei
 Yumi Iwai as Nagao Chiharu
Shigeru Tsuyuguchi as Nagao Ryunosuke
 Yoshihiko Aoyama as Asano Takumi no Kami
 Shousaku Sugiyama as Kira Yoshinaka
 Yoshi Katō as Horibe Yasubei
 Tastuo Matsumura as Chisaka Takafusa

Other adaptations
 Samurai Vendetta

References

Jidaigeki films
Samurai films
1960s Japanese films